Lamya's Poem is a 2021 animated adventure film, directed and written by Alex Kronemer. The film stars Mena Massoud, Millie Davis and Faran Tahir.

Premise
The film centres on Lamya, a young Syrian girl who has left her hometown of Aleppo as a refugee during the Syrian civil war, who finds solace in her inner fantasy life as she reads and is inspired by the poetry of Rumi.

Cast
 Mena Massoud as Rumi
 Millie Davis as Lamya
 Faran Tahir as Baha Walad
 Aya Bryn as Lamya's Mother
 Raoul Bhaneja as Mr. Hamadani / Smuggler 
 Nissae Isen as Bassam

Release
An excerpt from the film was screened at the 2020 Annecy International Animation Film Festival in the Works in Progress stream, before the completed film premiered at Annecy in 2021. WestEnd Films has international distribution rights, while ICM Partners holds North American rights.

Freestyle Digital Media acquired the North American DVD and VOD rights and will be released on digital HD internet, cable, and satellite platforms on February 21, 2023.

On review aggregator Rotten Tomatoes, Lamya's Poem has an approval rating of 100% based on 6 reviews with an average rating of 7 out of 10.

References

External links
 Official website
 

2021 films
2021 animated films
American animated films
Canadian animated feature films
Works about the Syrian civil war
2020s English-language films
2020s Canadian films
2020s American films